The 1985–86 Washington State Cougars men's basketball team represented Washington State University for the 1985–86 NCAA Division I men's basketball season. Led by third-year head coach Len Stevens, the Cougars were members of the Pacific-10 Conference and played their home games on campus at Beasley Coliseum in Pullman, Washington.

There was no conference tournament this season; it debuted the following year.

References

External links
Sports Reference – Washington State Cougars: 1985–86 basketball season

Washington State Cougars men's basketball seasons
Washington State Cougars
Washington State
Washington State